Abdullah Al-Tofail (born 23 February 1992) is a Saudi football player who plays as a winger.

References

1992 births
Living people
Saudi Arabian footballers
Al-Shoulla FC players
Al-Fayha FC players
Saudi First Division League players
Saudi Professional League players
Association football wingers